Tiger City is a shopping center in Taichung's 7th Redevelopment Zone, Xitun District, Taichung, Taiwan that opened on January 16, 2002.

History
 On January 16, 2002, the Tiger City Shopping Center, which was built at a cost of NT$3.5 billion, was officially opened.
 In 2006, Tiger City planned to spend NT$2.6 billion to build an amusement park next to the mall, of which NT$500 million was planned to be used to build a -high Ferris wheel, and the remaining NT$2.1 billion to build another  shopping mall. It was expected to be completed in 2008. But later, the expansion plan was cancelled, and was replaced by other builders to build a  skyscraper building - Ding Sheng BHW Taiwan Central Plaza.
 On October 13, 2016, the Taichung International Animation Film Festival debuted at Tiger City.

Stores
Zara
Sega
Toys "R" Us
Vieshow Cinemas

Gallery

See also
 List of tourist attractions in Taiwan
 Taichung's 7th Redevelopment Zone
 Mitsui Outlet Park Taichung
 Park Lane by CMP

References

External links

Tiger City Official Website

2002 establishments in Taiwan
Shopping malls in Taichung
Shopping malls established in 2002
Taichung's 7th Redevelopment Zone